HD 6114 is a visual binary star system in the northern constellation of Andromeda. With a combined apparent magnitude of 6.46, the star can only be seen with the naked eye by keen-eyed observers even on the best of nights.

The binary nature of this system was discovered by O. Struve in 1864. It consists of a magnitude 6.76 primary component with a dimmer magnitude 8.07 secondary. As of 2015 the pair had an angular separation of  along a position angle of 175°. The two stars orbit each other with a period of 450 years with an eccentricity of 0.80.

The primary is an A-type main-sequence star with a stellar classification of A9 V. At the estimated age of 863 million years, it is spinning rapidly with a projected rotational velocity of 149 km/s. The star has 1.65 times the mass of the Sun and is radiating 21 times the Sun's luminosity from its photosphere at an effective temperature of 7,611 K.

References

A-type main-sequence stars
Binary stars
Andromeda (constellation)
Durchmusterung objects
006114
0289
004911